Pen Ty-Nant is a hill within the Snowdonia National Park in Gwynedd, North Wales.

Location and summit view
It is a continuation of a small ridge that begins just to the northwest of Bala and ends at Moel y Garnedd on moorland known as the Gwastadros. On a clear day Pen yr Ole Wen, a member of the Carneddau can be seen above Llyn Celyn,  to the northwest. Carnedd y Filiast, Moel y Gydros and Moel Emoel are to the north / northeast. To the east are the Clwydian Range summits of Moel y Gamelin and Moel Morfydd, along with the closer Mynydd Mynyllod and its wind turbines near Glan-yr-afon. Cadair Berwyn, Cadair Bronwen and other peaks of the Berwyn range can be seen above Bala Lake to the east / southeast, and to the southwest, Aran Benllyn, Cadair Idris and Rhobell Fawr.

Ascent
A short route to the summit begins in Rhyd-uchaf and takes approximately 45 mins for a round trip. Alternatively a bridle path leads here from Bala. The summit is unmarked on open farmland.

References

Mountains and hills of Gwynedd
Llandderfel